Mission Viejo High School is a four-year comprehensive public high school located in Mission Viejo, California, United States, as part of the Saddleback Valley Unified School District. The school has served the area since 1966. Students within its attendance boundaries live in western Mission Viejo, southwest Lake Forest, Trabuco Canyon, Rancho Santa Margarita, and Laguna Hills. Its mascot is Pablo the Diablo and its colors are scarlet and gold. 230 credits are required to graduate. It is the home to one of the only agricultural farms on a high school campus in the Saddleback Valley Unified School District.

In the 2014–2015 school year, the school had an enrollment of 2,438 students and 92.7 classroom teachers (on an FTE basis), for a student–teacher ratio of 26.3:1. There were 333 students (13.7% of enrollment) eligible for free lunch and 100 (4.1% of students) eligible for reduced-cost lunch.

Academics

International Baccalaureate
Mission Viejo has been an International Baccalaureate (IB) school since July 1985. This program, taught to 80 students, is for academically talented and highly motivated students sponsored and administered by the IB Organization. The students who meet the IB requirements are eligible for the International Baccalaureate Diploma. This school received approximately 80 diplomas in the 2015–2016 school year.

Awards and recognition
Mission Viejo High School has been awarded the Blue Ribbon School and Award of Excellence by the United States Department of Education on three separate occasions, in 1988–89, 1994–96 and 2001–02, the highest award an American school can receive.

Mission Viejo High School has been recognized four times as a California Distinguished School, in 1988, 1994, 2001, and 2009.

Performing arts

Marching band

The school's marching band is part of the Western Band Association. They have competed in the 5A division every year until 2016, in which they began competing in 4A and won their division at the WBA Class Championships.

The drumline won High Percussion at WBA State Championships each year from 1997 to 2003, excluding 2000.

Choir
The school offers four different choir classes: Concert Choir, Diablo Chorus, Treble Choir and the Chamber Singers.

Sex abuse allegations
On March 23, 2022, two former Mission Viejo High School students filed a civil suit in Orange County Superior Court alleging that James Harris, husband of longtime drama teacher and performing arts coordinator Kathy Cannarozzi Harris and a substitute teacher at the school, groomed them and sexually abused them in the late 1990s. One of the plaintiffs was 15 at the time. The women allege that Kathy Harris personally observed the abuse, which allegedly occurred on the Mission Viejo High School campus and at her home. According to the filing, they reported the abuse several times over the course of two decades, including to the police and to the Saddleback Valley Unified School District, but no decisive action was taken. Jim Harris denied the allegations to the Los Angeles Times. The district said it was investigating. Kathy Harris was given paid leave, and no longer teaches at the school.

Notable alumni

References

External links

Educational institutions established in 1966
High schools in Orange County, California
International Baccalaureate schools in California
Public high schools in California
Mission Viejo, California
1966 establishments in California